The Super Basketball League (超級籃球聯賽), often abbreviated as the SBL, is a semi-professional men's basketball league in Taiwan.

Current clubs 
Currently, there are four teams competing in the SBL. They are as follows:

 Bank of Taiwan (臺灣銀行)
 Changhua BLL (彰化柏力力)
 Taiwan Beer (台灣啤酒)
 Yulon Luxgen Dinos (裕隆納智捷)

Former clubs 
 Dacin Tigers (達欣工程) – now competes in the A-League
 Fubon Braves (富邦勇士) – now competes in the P. League+ (PLG)
 Kaohsiung Jeoutai Technology (高雄九太科技) – club dissolved on 30 May 2022
 Taoyuan Pauian Archiland (桃園璞園建築) – playing spot on loan to Changhua BLL

Champions 
Champions and other postseason standings are listed below:

Finals appearances 
This is a list of the teams which have advanced to the SBL Finals and the overall win–loss records they have registered in the Championship Series.

League MVP 
The winner of the Super Basketball League Most Valuable Player (MVP) award is chosen by reporters.  The recipients of the award are listed below:

Notable players

Guards 
 Chang Chih-feng (張智峰): 6'0", one-time champion, one-time regular season and finals MVP, two-time All-SBL Team, one-time Defensive Player of the Year, two-time steal champion
 Chen Chih-chung (陳志忠): 6'0", four-time champion, one-time finals MVP, three-time All-SBL Team, one-time Defensive Player of the Year, one-time assist champion, one-time Sixth Man of the Year
 Lee Hsueh-lin (李學林): 5'9", four-time champion, one-time All-SBL Team

Forwards 
 Chen Hsin-an (陳信安): 6'5", two-time champion, one-time regular season MVP, one-time finals MVP, one-time All-SBL Team, one-time scoring champion
 Lin Chih-chieh (林志傑): 6'3", two-time champion, two-time finals MVP, one-time regular season MVP, three-time All-SBL Team, two-time scoring champion
 Jonathan Sanders (桑德斯): 6'7", three-time All-SBL Team, three-time rebound champion, two-time assist champion, one-time Fighter of the Year (年度最佳鬥士) 
 Tien Lei (田壘): 6'8", one-time champion, three-time regular season MVP, three-time All-SBL Team, three-time rebound champion, two-time scoring champion, one-time steal champion and played for Sacramento Kings in 2005 NBA Summer League
 Noel Felix
 Marcus Fizer
 Taylor King, Former McDonald's All-American and Duke basketball player

Centers 
 Tseng Wen-ting (曾文鼎): 6'9", four-time champion, two-time finals MVP, one-time regular season MVP, four-time All-SBL Team and Defensive Player of the Year, six-time block champion
 Wu Tai-hao (吳岱豪): 6'8", one-time champion, one-time All-SBL Team, one-time block champion
 Patrick O'Bryant
 Solomon Alabi
 Garret Siler
 Earl Barron

Women's Super Basketball League 

There is also a Women's Super Basketball League (WSBL) in Taiwan, which comprises the following four teams:

 Cathay Life (國泰人壽)
 Chunghwa Telecom (中華電信)
 Taiwan Power (台灣電力)
 Taiyuan Textile (台元紡織)

See also 
 Chinese Basketball Alliance (CBA)
 Chinese Taipei men's national basketball team
 List of basketball leagues
 P. League+ (PLG)
 Sport in Taiwan
 T1 League
 Women's Super Basketball League (WSBL)

References

External links 
 SBL official website
 Taiwan Beer official website
 Taiwan Mobile Clouded Leopards official website
 Yulon Luxgen Dinos official website
 YMY official website
 Taiwan Hoops
 Asia-Basket - Taiwan
 High flying hoop dreams: A brief history of the development of basketball in Taiwan (in English)

 
S
2003 establishments in Taiwan
Sports leagues established in 2003
Professional sports leagues in Taiwan